is a Japanese alpine skier. She competed at the 1988 Winter Olympics and the 1992 Winter Olympics.

References

1970 births
Living people
Japanese female alpine skiers
Olympic alpine skiers of Japan
Alpine skiers at the 1988 Winter Olympics
Alpine skiers at the 1992 Winter Olympics
Sportspeople from Nagano Prefecture
Asian Games medalists in alpine skiing
Asian Games gold medalists for Japan
Asian Games silver medalists for Japan
Alpine skiers at the 1990 Asian Winter Games
Medalists at the 1990 Asian Winter Games
20th-century Japanese women